The Kostur dialect (Kosturski dijalekt), is a member of the Southwestern subgroup of the Southeastern group of dialects of the Macedonian language. This dialect is mainly spoken in and around the town of Kastoria, known locally in Macedonian as Kostur, and in the surrounding Korešta region, which encompasses most of the area to the northwest of the town. The Kostur dialect is also partially spoken in Albania, most notably in Bilisht and the village of Vërnik (Vrabnik). The dialect is partially preserved among the ″people of Bulgarian origin in Mustafapaşa and Cemilköy, Turkey, descending from the village of Agios Antonios (Zhèrveni) in Kostur region (Aegean Macedonia)″.

The Kostur dialect shares strong similarities with the Nestram-Kostenar dialect and the Korča dialect. Bulgarian linguist Stoyko Stoykov regarded the Nestram dialect as a subgroup of the Kostur dialect, part of Bulgarian dialects. Other Bulgarian linguists also regard the dialect as a Bulgarian dialect.

Phonological characteristics
 PSl. *sǫtь > , PSl. *krǫgъ > , PSl. *gǫba > , PSl. *pǫtь >  ~  ~ , PSl. *mǫka > , *kǫtja > .
 PSl. *govędo > , PSl. *zvękъ > , PSl. *(j)erębica > .
 PSl. *ě → ;
 PSl. *mlěko (← *melko) > .
 PSl. *sladъkъ (← *soldъkъ) > , PSl. *dьnь > .
 PSl. *světja > , PSl. *medja >  ~ , PSl. *dъkti > .
 In some subdialects, the distinction between PSl. *i and *y is preserved (i.e. they have not merged to *i as in other Macedonian dialects).
 Fixed stress. The stress is on the penult, although there are exceptions. It is valid when not taken into account the definite morphemes.

Morphological characteristics
 Third-person personal pronouns: masc. , fem. , neut. , pl.  ('he, she, it, they').

Usage
The dialect is commonly viewed as one of the most divergent forms of the Macedonian dialect continuum. Today it is primarily restricted to oral communication among native speakers; however, in the past the dialect was frequently used in its written form. As late as the Greek Civil War the dialect was being used in newspapers and other print. The Nova Makedonka (New Macedonian Woman) newspaper published in the period 1948–1949, was published both in the Kostur dialect and in Greek. The Edinstvo newspaper published from 1947–1949 also solely made use of the Kostur dialect.

In 2011 a memoir book in the Kostur dialect using a Bulgarian orthography was published in Sofia, Bulgaria.

Research
The first written materials in the Kostur dialect were of different types of folklore texts, such as songs and folk tales, which were collected in the 19th century. The Bulgarian folklorists Miladinov brothers published 13 folk songs from region of Kostur in their important collection of folk songs, Bulgarian Folk Songs. In Western European Slavic studies relevant to the research of the dialect is the book by André Mazon about the Slavic songs and the dialects from southwestern Macedonia, published in 1923.

The first complete dictionary of the Kostur dialect was published by Blagoy Shklifov. Afterwards, Shklifov analyzed his native Kostur dialect, comparing it and standard Bulgarian with Old Church Slavonic, and explained the development of many sounds in Bulgarian language, notably ѫ.

References

Literature
 Стойко Стойков за Костурския говор (Българска диалектология, С. 2002, с. 181–182) – Stoykov, Stoyko. Bulgarian Dialectology, Sofia 2002 (in Bulgarian).
 Кузов, Аргир. https://www.strumski.com/books/A_Kuzov_Kosturskijat_Govor.pdf
 Ничев, Александър. Костурският българо-гръцки речник от XVI век. С., 1987, 82 с. (Nichev, Alexander. The Bulgarian-Greek Dictionary from Kostur From the 16th Century, Sofia 1987, 82 p.)
 Матов, Д. Остатъци от звуковете ън, ъм, ен, ем в Костурския говор. – Книжици, 1889, № 1, 17 – 26.
 Видоески, Божидар – Фонолошки опис на говорот на село Тиолишча (Костурско). Прилози МАНУ, 4, 1979, №2, 5–16.
 Королов, Лари-Лабро (Канада) Развоят на праславянските *tj/ktj и *dj/gdj в диалектите на четири села в Югозападна Македония, Македонски преглед, 2018, кн. 4 с. 109 – 116
 Королов, Лари-Лабро Бележка за формите на лексемата „български“ в диалектите на Югозападна и Южна Централна Македония Македонски преглед, 2020, кн. 1 c. 145 – 148
 Королов, Лари-Лабро (Канада). Диалектен текст от село Въмбел, Костурско. Свидетелство за миналото на българите в южна Македония през първата половина на XX век. // Македонски преглед XLV (3). 2022. с. 68 - 79.
 Шклифов, Благой. Глаголната система на костурския говор. – Език и литература, 1967, № 3, 82 – 91.
 Шклифов, Благой. Костурският говор, София 1973. (Shklifov, Blagoy. The Kostur dialect, Sofia 1973)
 Шклифов, Благой. Фразеологичен речник на село Черешница, Костурско, София, 2016 (Shklifov, Blagoy. Phraseological Dictionary of the Dialect of the Village of Chereshnitsa, Kostur District. Sofia, 2016)
 Шклифов, Благой. Речник на костурския говор, Българска диалектология, Българска диалектология, София 1977, с. кн. VIII, с. 201 – 328. (Shklifov,Blagoy. Dictionary of the Kostur Dialect, Bulgarian Dialectology, Sofia, 1977.
 Шклифов, Благой. Български диалектни текстове от Егейска Македония, София 2003, 287 с., в съавторство с Екатерина Шклифова (Shklifov, Blagoy, Shklifova, Ekaterina. Bulgarian Dialect Texts from Aegean Macedonia, Sofia, 2003.
 Шклифов, Благой. Глаголната система на костурския говор. – Език и литература, 1967, № 3, 82 – 91.

Dialects of the Macedonian language
Dialects of the Bulgarian language
Kastoria (regional unit)
Kastoria